The , also nicknamed the , is a multi-purpose stadium in Niigata, Japan. It is the home ground of J2 League club Albirex Niigata and was one of the 20 stadia used in the 2002 FIFA World Cup, hosting three matches. Through a sponsorship deal the stadium is officially named , and has previously been called the Tohoku Denryoku Big Swan Stadium for similar reason.

The stadium's capacity is 42,300. The highest recorded attendance at the stadium was Albirex Niigata's home fixture against Omiya Ardija on 23 November 2003, the final day of the 2003 J. League Division 2, with 42,223 fans attending.

Naming history
In 2007, Tohoku Electric Power bought the naming rights to the Niigata Stadium for ¥120 million/year, retitling the stadium as the "Tohoku Denryoku Big Swan Stadium". In September 2013, Denki Kagaku Kogyo (Denka) bought the naming rights for ¥70 million/year, and the stadium was rebranded as the "Denka Big Swan Stadium" in a 3-year deal.

Rugby
The stadium also sometimes hosts rugby union Top League games and on 
May 18, 2008 Japan played Hong Kong here in the 2008 Asian Five Nations.

2002 FIFA World Cup
Niigata Stadium hosted 3 matches in the 2002 FIFA World Cup.

Access
Transit bus
There is a bus stop ' ', 1 minute walk away from the stadium. Transit bus operated by Niigata Kotsu S70, S71, S72 (line: S7) runs from Niigata Station South Exit.

See also
Niigata Prefectural Baseball Stadium

References

External links

  Official site

2002 FIFA World Cup stadiums in Japan
2001 FIFA Confederations Cup stadiums in Japan
Football venues in Japan
Athletics (track and field) venues in Japan
Buildings and structures in Niigata (city)
Rugby union stadiums in Japan
Sports venues in Niigata Prefecture
Albirex Niigata
2001 establishments in Japan
Sports venues completed in 2001